Malva parviflora is an annual or perennial herb that is native to Northern Africa, Europe and Asia and is widely naturalised elsewhere. Common names include cheeseweed, cheeseweed mallow, Egyptian mallow, least mallow, little mallow, mallow, marshmallow, small-flowered mallow, small-flowered marshmallow and smallflower mallow.
M. parviflora leaf extracts possess anti-inflammatory and antioxidant activities.
It has a decumbent or erect habit, growing up to 50 cm in height. The broad leaves have 5 to 7 lobes and are 8 to 10 cm in diameter.  It has small white or pink flowers with 4 to 6 mm long petals.

References

External links
 
 
 GBIF: Occurrence data for Malva parviflora
 Jepson Manual Treatment
 USDA Plants Profile
 
 
 

parviflora
Flora of Lebanon
Flora of Malta